The Romania national badminton team represents Romania in international badminton team competitions. The Romanian national team have never participated in the Sudirman Cup, Thomas Cup and the Uber Cup.

The Romanian team only participated the European Men's and Women's Team Badminton Championships once, which was in 2006 where the team were eliminated in the group stages.

Participation in European Team Badminton Championships

Men's Team

Participation in Helvetia Cup 
The Helvetia Cup or European B Team Championships was a European mixed team championship in badminton. The first Helvetia Cup tournament took place in Zurich, Switzerland in 1962. The tournament took place every two years from 1971 until 2007, after which it was dissolved. Romania's best result was achieving 7th place in the 2007 Helvetia Cup.

Participation in European Junior Team Badminton Championships
Mixed Team

Current squad 

Male players
Andreas Thiel
Catalin Ionascu
Daniel Popescu
Eduard-Marius Ica
Florentin Gîsca
Matei Droanca
Mihai Grosu
Mircea Vasiu
Paul Haranguş

Female players
Alexandra Haranguş
Alexandra Soare
Ana-Madalina Bratu
Andra Olariu
Cristina Soare
Diana Stroie
Ioana Grecea
Ioana Ionica
Loredana Lungu
Luiza Milu
Maria Alexandra Dutu
Sonia Rațiu

References

Badminton
National badminton teams
Badminton in Romania